Westlake High School is a secondary school located in the west central section of Waldorf, Charles County, Maryland.

Notable alumni
Cordae Amari Dunston, rapper known as Cordae
Marquel Lee, NFL linebacker for the Oakland Raiders
Shawn Lemon, CFL lineman for the Toronto Argonauts
Christina Milian, musician
Natasha Rothwell, an American writer, actress, teacher and comedian
Randy Starks, NFL defensive end

Sports
3A State football champions in 2008.MPSSAA Football

Notes

External links
 Westlake High School web page

Public high schools in Maryland
Schools in Charles County, Maryland
Waldorf, Maryland
Educational institutions established in 1992
1992 establishments in Maryland